The knockout stage for the 2022 Uber Cup in Bangkok, Thailand, began on 12 May 2022 with the quarter-finals and will end on 14 May with the final tie.

Qualified teams
The top two placed teams from each of the eight groups will qualify for this stage.

Bracket
The draw was conducted on 11 May 2022, after the last match of the group stage.

Quarter-finals

Japan vs Chinese Taipei

South Korea vs Denmark

India vs Thailand

Indonesia vs China

Semi-finals

Japan vs South Korea

Thailand vs China

Final

South Korea vs China

References

Uber knockout stage